The Blunt House Livestock Barn is a historic barn in rural White County, Arkansas.  It is located on the north side of County Road 94 (Babb Road), west of the hamlet of Midway.  It is a wood-frame structure  stories in height, with a gambrel roof and a shed-roof ha storage extension to the east.  It is finished in board-and-batten siding; its roof is corrugated metal.  Built c. 1920, it is the county's best example of barns built between about 1914 and 1939.  The barn is somewhat rare, as gambrel roofs were not commonly used in barn construction in the county before 1930.

The barn was listed on the National Register of Historic Places in 1992.

See also
 National Register of Historic Places listings in White County, Arkansas

References

Barns on the National Register of Historic Places in Arkansas
Buildings and structures completed in 1920
National Register of Historic Places in White County, Arkansas
1920 establishments in Arkansas